A star clock (or nocturnal) is a method of using the stars to determine the time. This is accomplished by measuring the Big Dipper's position in the sky based on a standard clock, and then employing simple addition and subtraction. This method requires no tools; others use an astrolabe and a planisphere.

A clock's regulator can be adjusted so that it keeps the Mean Sidereal Time rate.  When it is then set to an observer's Local Mean Sidereal Time then a star will transit the meridian (passing directly north or south) at the sidereal time of the star's Right Ascension.

See also
 Sidereal time

External links
 Telling Time by Sun and Stars by John P. Pratt
 Inquiry.net

Time in astronomy